Eylon Yerushalmi is an Israeli footballer who plays for Hapoel Ramat Gan.

References

External links
 

1997 births
Living people
Israeli footballers
Maccabi Netanya F.C. players
Hapoel Hadera F.C. players
Sektzia Ness Ziona F.C. players
Hapoel Umm al-Fahm F.C. players
Hapoel Ramat Gan F.C. players
Israeli Premier League players
Liga Leumit players
Footballers from Ramat Gan
Association football midfielders